Rama III Road (usually shortened to ) is one main road in inner Bangkok.

Route
Rama III Road starts from the foot of Krungthep Bridge in Thanon Tok quarter where it intersects with Mahai Sawan and the last phase of Charoen Krung Roads in the area of Bang Kho Laem District. Then eastward up till Nang Linchi Junction, where it crosses Nang Linchi Road at front of Wat Chong Lom temple, then northeastward crosses Chuea Phloeng Road and Eastern Railway Line (Mae Nam Branch) from nearby Mae Nam Railway Station on the periphery of Yannawa and Khlong Toei Districts, then enters the full Khlong Toei area up till ends at Na Ranong Square, the five-ways intersection of Sunthonkosa, Ratchadaphisek and Na Ranong Roads near Khlong Toei Market and PAT Stadium.

The bus rapid transit, Bangkok BRT (Sathon–Ratchaphruek route) operate and there are six stations (consist of Rama III Bridge, Charoenrat, Rama IX Bridge, Wat Dokmai, Wat Pariwat, Wat Dan) on this road.

Rama III is a road that connects to many main roads, including Ratchadaphisek, Sathu Pradit, Rama IV, Sathon, Chan, Naradhiwas Rajanagarindra Roads, as well as Bhumibol Bridge (Mega Bridge), etc. 

Rama III Bridge (widely known as Krungthep II Bridge or New Krungthep Bridge) carries the road as well.

History
Rama III Road was born before the 1997 financial crisis when Thai government wanted to expand the commercial zone from the narrow and unable to expand Silom Road to a new location. Therefore, there are many businessmen and investors investing in building many high-rise buildings included a large number port warehouses along the road, such as CentralPlaza Rama III, Bank of Ayudhya Headquarters, Bangkok Bank, Rama III Office and IT Division, which many of these buildings have become abandoned because of the 1997 financial crisis.

Its named in honour of Nangklao (Rama III), the third sovereign of Chakri dynasty, who was regarded as an expert in merchanting, to match the road history and its condition. Because in the past, there were merchant ships cruising along the river, where Thanon Tok Port was considered the main port of Siamese capital in those days.

References

Streets in Bangkok
Bang Kho Laem district
Yan Nawa district
Khlong Toei district
Buildings and structures on the Chao Phraya River